This is a chronological list of games released by Carry Lab, a defunct Japanese software house. One of their games, Hao's Mystery Adventure, did make it to North American shores as Mystery Quest for the Nintendo Entertainment System, although the game, published by Taxan, was a cut version.

Games

Carry Lab